Hockey Club Ambrì-Piotta is a Swiss professional ice hockey club and a member of the National League (NL). The club was founded September 19, 1937, and is also known as "Bianco-Blu" (English: white and blues). Though they have never won the league championship, the club has not been relegated to the Swiss League since being promoted in 1985, the same year that saw the arrival of Dale McCourt.

The team plays its home games in the 7,000-seat Nuova Valascia.

History

Ambrì and Piotta are two small villages in the municipality of Quinto, located in the northern part of the valley Leventina canton Ticino, with a combined population of 500 people. Ambrì-Piotta has more than 40 fan clubs all over Europe. For major events, like the derby against southern rivals HC Lugano, the fans compose a choreography. When Ambrì wins a game, fans rejoice to the valley anthem "La Montanara".

Since 1959, they have called their self-owned Valascia as their home. Standing 1,000 metres above sea level, it is an open-ended facility with 2,000 seats and additional standing room space for 5,000.

Facing financial strains, the team raised roughly five million Swiss francs in the summer of 2013. The donations given to HC Ambrì-Piotta came from both large and small donations, many of which were given via SMS. The efforts of the team and its fans have secured the right to play in the National League.

Honours

Domestic

National League
  Runners-up (1): 1998–99

Swiss Cup 
  Winners (1): 1962

International

IIHF Continental Cup
  Winners (2): 1998–99, 1999–2000

IIHF Super Cup
  Winners (1): 1999
  Runners-up (1): 2000

Invitational

Spengler Cup
  Winners (1): 2022
Basler Cup
   (2): 1953, 1959

Players

Current roster

NHL alumni

 Richard Park
 Marco Baron
 Andy Bathgate
 Paul DiPietro
 Hnat Domenichelli
 Pauli Jaks
 Kim Johnsson
 Valeri Kamensky
 Larry Kwong
 Andreas Lilja
 Ryan Malone
 Dale McCourt
 Oleg Petrov
 Róbert Petrovický
 Leif Rohlin
 Jean-Guy Trudel
 Erik Westrum
 Matt Duchene
 Max Pacioretty
 Cory Schneider
 Maxim Noreau
 Scottie Upshall
 Dominik Kubalík
 Don Laurence
 Mike Kaszycki
 Alex Formenton

References

External links

 Official site of Hockey Club Ambrì-Piotta
 Ambrì-Piotta fan site

Ice hockey teams in Switzerland